‌The 2016 Asian Men's Club League Handball Championship was the 19th edition of the Asian Club League Handball Championship held under the aegis of Asian Handball Federation.The championship was hosted by Al-Ahli Sports Club in Amman (Jordan) from 29 October to 5 November 2016. Al-Noor Club of Saudi Arabia won the championship by beating two times champion El-Jaish Sports Club of Qatar in the final match by 25-23. Defending Champion Lekhwiya Sports Club of Qatar managed to get bronze medal after beating Gachsaran Oil & Gas Club of Islamic Republic of Iran by 31-21. It is the official competition for men's handball clubs of Asia crowning the Asian champions. The winner of the championship qualified for the 2017 IHF Super Globe.

Draw

Group A

Group B

5th–8th placement matches

7th–8th-place match

5th–6th-place match

Semifinal matches

Bronze-medal match

Gold-medal match

Final standings

References

External links
 asianhandball.com
 Asian handball Champions League - goalzz.com

Handball competitions in Asia
Asian Handball Championships
Asian Men's Club League Handball Championship, 2016
Asia
International handball competitions hosted by Jordan
Sports competitions in Amman